Manne–That's Gershwin! is an album by drummer Shelly Manne featuring music by George Gershwin, recorded in 1965 and released on the Capitol label.

Reception

The AllMusic reviewer Scott Yanow stated: "Although not all that memorable, this music generally swings, leaves space for concise solos and is fairly fresh".

Track listing
All compositions by George and Ira Gershwin, except as indicated
 "By Strauss" - 2:53
 "My Man's Gone Now" (George Gershwin, DuBose Heyward) - 3:30
 "Mine" - 3:55
 "Love Is Here to Stay" - 2:31
 "Summertime" (Gershwin, Heyward) - 3:55
 "The Real American Folk Song (is a Rag)" - 2:45
 "The Man I Love" - 5:23
 "Prelude #2" (George Gershwin) - 2:37
 "How Long Has This Been Going On?" - 2:33
 "Theme from Concerto in F" (George Gershwin) - 2:55

Personnel
Shelly Manne - drums
Conte Candoli, Lee Katzman, Larry McGuire, Al Porcino, Ray Triscari, Stu Williamson, Jimmy Zito - trumpet
Bob Edmondson, Frank Rosolino, Mike Barone - trombone
Richard Perissi, Vincent DeRosa - French horn
John Bambridge - tuba
Frank Strozier - alto saxophone
Jack Nimitz, Justin Gordon, Bud Shank - woodwinds 
Russ Freeman - piano
Monty Budwig - bass
John Williams - musical director

References

1965 albums
Capitol Records albums
Shelly Manne albums
Albums produced by Dave Cavanaugh

Albums recorded at Capitol Studios